The Follett Stone Arch Bridge Historic District encompasses a group of four stone arch bridges in southwestern Townshend, Vermont.  All four bridges were built by James Otis Follett, a local self-taught mason, between 1894 and 1910, and represent the single greatest concentration of surviving bridges he built.  The district was listed on the National Register of Historic Places in 1976.

Description and history
James Otis Follett was a local farmer, who apparently learned the craft of bridge-building from books and his experiences as a road commissioner.  Between 1894 and his death in 1911 he is estimated to have built at least forty stone arch bridges, most in Townshend and immediately adjacent communities.  This assemblage is particularly noteworthy, as most bridges of the time were being built using iron and steel.  Southwest of Townshend's village center, crossing streams on the west side of the West River downstream of Townshend Dam are four of his bridges.  The surrounding area once had seven, but three have been demolished or washed away.

Fair Brook Bridge

One of the abutments is angled, suggesting it was built for an earlier bridge.

Rogers Road Bridge
Rogers Road was bisected by construction of the Townshend Dam. This bridge crosses a normally dry channel of Fair Brook, and is one of Follett's smaller bridges.

Buck Hill Road Bridge
This bridge crosses another intermittent stream on a logging road (about ) that is a former alignment of Buck Hill Road, which is now a short spur extending south from the Scott Covered Bridge.

Negro Brook Bridge
Like the other bridges, its width is limited to a single modern vehicular travel lane. It is located just upstream of the current State Forest Road bridge.

See also
National Register of Historic Places listings in Windham County, Vermont
List of bridges on the National Register of Historic Places in Vermont

References

Road bridges on the National Register of Historic Places in Vermont
Bridges completed in 1894
Bridges in Windham County, Vermont
Townshend, Vermont
Historic districts on the National Register of Historic Places in Vermont
National Register of Historic Places in Windham County, Vermont
Historic districts in Windham County, Vermont
Stone arch bridges in the United States